Estigmene flaviceps is a species of moth of the family Erebidae. It was described by George Hampson in 1907. It is found in Angola, Ghana, Senegal and Sierra Leone.

References

 

Spilosomina
Moths described in 1907